The National Assembly Proceeding Hall is the South Korean capitol building. It serves as the location of the National Assembly of the Republic of Korea, the legislative branch of the South Korean national government. It is located at Yeouido-dong, Yeongdeungpo-gu, Seoul.

History
The current building was completed in 1975. Before 1975 the South Korean government used the current , a public hall created during the Japanese occupation of Korea. The plenary chamber has seating for 400 people, ostensibly in preparation for new lawmakers in case Korean reunification occurs. The National Assembly Proceeding Hall has been used for the inaugurations for several presidents Roh Tae-woo in 1988, Kim Young-sam in 1993, Kim Dae-jung in 1998, Roh Moo-hyun in 2003, Lee Myung-bak in 2008, Park Geun-hye in 2013, Moon Jae-in in 2017, and Yoon Suk-yeol in 2022.

See also 
National Assembly of South Korea
Blue House, the South Korean president's former official residence

References 

Yeouido
Buildings and structures in Seoul
1975 establishments in South Korea
Government buildings in South Korea
Legislative buildings
Government buildings completed in 1975
Seats of national legislatures
Government buildings with domes
Buildings and structures in Yeongdeungpo District
20th-century architecture in South Korea